The 7th Arkansas Field Battery, originally known as the  Blocher's Battery  (1862–1865), was a Confederate artillery battery that served during the American Civil War. The unit was also known as Blocher's Battery or Zimmerman's Battery.  The battery spent its entire existence in the Department of the Trans-Mississippi.

Organization
Blocher's Battery was created in the summer of 1862 during Major General Thomas C. Hindman's effort to rebuild Confederate forces in Arkansas.  When Major General Earl Van Dorn transferred his Army of the West from Arkansas to Northern Mississippi in April 1862, he stripped the state of its military stores and almost every organized military unit, including all of the artillery.  The only organized batteries were actually in the Indian Territory (modern Oklahoma) supporting Brigadier General Albert Pike's forces.  One of Hindman's first acts in command was to order Woodruff's Battery, also known as the Weaver Light Artillery, to return to Little Rock from the Indian Territory.  When the battery reached Little Rock, General Hindman learned that Woodruff's Battery had not been reorganized as required by the Confederate Conscription Act of April 1862.  To correct this, General Hindman ordered that the battery re-organize and a new election of officers occur. In this election, First Lieutenant William Durbin Blocher and First Lieutenant James Cook were not re-elected.  Hindman immediate ordered that these officers remain in the artillery service and directed them to organize a new battery. To facilitate the creation of this new battery, General Hindman arranged for the transfer of an experienced cadre of cannoneers from Woodruff's battery to Blocher's new battery.

Blocher's Battery was organized at Little Rock, Arkansas, on August 6, 1862.  An experienced cadre of veterans from the Weaver Light Artillery (Woodruff's Battery) was assigned to the new battery, which was augmented by unassigned recruits and transfers from other regiments.  The battery officers were Captain William Durbin Blocher, First Lieutenant James Cook, Second Lieutenant Jesse V. Zimmerman, and Third Lieutenant Edward Visart, all of whom were assigned from the Weaver Light Artillery.

Service

Blocher's Battery served in the Trans-Mississippi Department throughout the war, and campaigned in Arkansas, Louisiana, Missouri and the Indian Territory.  In December 1862 the battery was assigned to Brigadier General James F. Fagans' brigade of Brigadier General James F. Fagan's division of Major General Thomas C. Hindman's 1st Corps, Army the Trans-Mississippi for the Prairie Grove campaign. During the Battle of Prairie Grove the battery's guns were captured by the 20th Wisconsin Infantry.  The unit's position changed hands repeatedly during the battle. The following is Captain Blocher's report of the Battle of Prairie Grove:

In the re-organization of the Army of the Trans-Mississippi following the Prairie Grove Campaign, in January, 1863, the battery was assigned to support Fagan's Brigade in Hindman's Division.

Following the retreat of Hindman's forces from northwest Arkansas, the battery spent the spring and early summer of 1863 in an artillery camp with the other batteries of Major W. E. Woodruff's artillery battalion near St. John's College in Little Rock.  Woodruff was assigned as the Chief of Artillery to Major General D. M. Frost's Division.  Woodruff's Artillery Battalion at this time was composed of Etter's Battery, Marshall's Battery, and Blocher's Arkansas Batteries, Tildent and Ruffner's Missouri Batteries, and Edgar's Texas Battery. This spring encampment was the only time during the war that Woodruff's Battalion was able to actually practice the artillery drill as a battalion, since the units usually fought as independent batteries or even sections.

The battery fought with Brigadier General Fagan's brigade at the Battle of Helena on July 4, 1863. Launching the attack on Hindman Hill (Battery D) at first light, Fagan's men suffered heavily under enfilading fire from Graveyard Hill (Battery C) to Fagan's left. Fagan's men carried lines of rifle pits but could not capture Hindman Hill. Blocher's battery was impeded by trees that Union soldier had felled along the roads and all approaches to the Federal positions and did not report any casualties from the battle. During the Little Rock Campaign the battery, while still assigned to Fagan's Brigade, participated in the Battle of Bayou Fourche on September 10, 1863. During the Battle of Bayou Fourche, Fagan's Brigade with Blocher's Battery moved to reinforce Brigadier General Marmaduke's Cavalry Division in opposing union forces which had forced a crossing of the Arkansas River, east of Little Rock. Blocher's Battery occupied a position in from a temporary battery which had been assembled by William E. Woodruff, Jr. Woodruff's referred to the temporary organization as his "Bull Battery" because the guns were pulled by oxen.  Blocher was apparently warned by Woodruff, "my bulls are not good at maneuvering, they were too new, and when the ball opened, I should fire straight ahead if the aim should happen to lie that way, and that he (Blocher) must look "a little out".

In April, 1864, the battery was assigned to support the Brigadier General William Lewis Cabell's cavalry brigade of General Fagan's Cavalry Division. The unit participated in the Camden Expedition in the spring of 1864.   Lieutenant Zimmerman led one section of Blocher's Battery to support Brigadier General Marmaduke's Cavalry Division. Zimmerman's section of Blocher's Battery participated in the Battle of Elkin's Ferry on April 3, 1864.  The battery was involved in the fighting at the Battle of Prairie D'Ane on April 10, 1864, and the Battle of Marks' Mill on April 25, 1864.

The battery, under the command of Lieutenant J. V. Zimmerman, participated with Dobbins' brigade in Price's Missouri Raid in September and October 1864: The battery is mentioned in Union Army Reports of the Battle of Fort Davidson, also known as the Battle of Pilot Knob, on September 27, 1864:

The battery was present for or engaged in the following actions during Price's Missouri Raid, Arkansas-Missouri-Kansas, September–October, 1864:
Battle of Fort Davidson, Missouri, September 27, 1864
Fourth Battle of Boonville, Missouri, October 11, 1864
Second Battle of Lexington, Missouri, October 19, 1864
Battle of Little Blue River, Missouri, October 21, 1864
Second Battle of Independence, Missouri, October 21–22, 1864
Battle of Byram's Ford, Missouri, October 22–23, 1864
Battle of Westport, Missouri, October 23, 1864
Battle of Marais des Cygnes, Linn County, Kansas, October 25, 1864
Battle of Mine Creek, Missouri, October 25, 1864
Battle of Marmiton River, Missouri, October 25, 1864
Second Battle of Newtonia, Missouri, October 28, 1864

In November 1864, the battery was redesignated as the Seventh Arkansas Field Battery, and was assigned to the Fifth Artillery Battalion.  Captain Blocher, who had been promoted to major, commanded the battalion, and Lieutenant Zimmerman succeeded him in command of the battery.  Other component batteries in the Fifth Artillery Battalion were the First Arkansas Field Battery (McNally), Third Arkansas Field Battery (Marshall), Fourth Arkansas Field Battery (West), First Missouri Field Battery (Ruffner), and Third Missouri Field Battery (Lesueur).

On December 31, 1864, General E. Kirby Smith listed the battery as belonging to Blocher's Artillery Battalion of Acting Major General Churchill's First Infantry Division of Major General John B. Magruder's Second Army Corps, Army of the Trans-Mississippi.

Surrender
William E. Woodruff, Jr, in his book, "With the Light Guns in '61-65' reports that Zimmerman's 7th Arkansas Field Battery and Marshall's 3rd Arkansas Field Battery were consolidated, under the command of Captain Zimmerman, before the end of the war and he indicates that the consolidated organization was in camp near Marshall, Texas, when the war ended.  Blocher's (now Zimmerman's) Battery surrendered with the Trans-Mississippi Army on May 26, 1865. The date of the military convention between Confederate General Edmund Kirby Smith and Union General Edward Canby for the surrender of the troops and public property in the Trans-Mississippi Department was May 26, 1865, however, it took a while for parole commissioners to be appointed and for public property to be accounted for. As a result, a final report of field artillery which was part of the accounting process, was not completed until June 1, 1865. The final report lists both Marshall's and Zimmerman's batteries as separate units, with Zimmerman's four guns located near Collinsburg, Louisiana and Marshall's at Marshall, Texas, with no guns.

See also

 List of Arkansas Civil War Confederate units
 Lists of American Civil War Regiments by State
 Confederate Units by State
 Arkansas in the American Civil War
 Arkansas Militia in the Civil War

Notes

References
 Alexander, P. W. (1835). Peter Wellington Alexander papers.
 Burford, T. W., & McBride, S. G. (2000). The division: Defending Little Rock : August 25 - September 10, 1863. Jacksonville, Ark: WireStorm Pub.
 Sikakis, Stewart, Compendium of the Confederate Armies, Florida and Arkansas, Facts on File, Inc., 1992, 
 United States. (1961). Compiled service records of Confederate soldiers who served in organizations from the State of Arkansas. Washington, D.C.: National Archives, National Archives and Records Service, General Services Administration.
 U.S. War Department, The War of the Rebellion: a Compilation of the Official Records of the Union and Confederate Armies, U.S. Government Printing Office, 1880–1901.
 Woodruff, W. E. (1903). With the light guns in '61-'65: Reminiscences of eleven Arkansas, Missouri and Texas light batteries, in the civil war. Little Rock, Ark: Central printing company.

External links
 Edward G. Gerdes Civil War Home Page
 The Encyclopedia of Arkansas History and Culture
 The War of the Rebellion: a Compilation of the Official Records of the Union and Confederate Armies
 The Arkansas History Commission, State Archives, Civil War in Arkansas

Units and formations of the Confederate States Army from Arkansas
1865 disestablishments in Arkansas
Military units and formations in Arkansas
Military units and formations established in 1862
Military units and formations disestablished in 1865
Military in Arkansas
1862 establishments in Arkansas
Artillery units and formations of the American Civil War